A Korale or Corale was formerly a revenue district in Ceylon (Sri Lanka). During the British colonial administration, a low country korale was under the purview of a Mudaliyar while an upcountry korale came under the purview of a post that was itself known as Korale or Korale Mahaththaya. To this day localities retain their old names and most land titles retain reference to the Korale the land is located in.

See also
Divisional Secretariats of Sri Lanka

References

British Ceylon
Transitional period of Sri Lanka
Kandyan period